Parapetrobius is a genus of jumping bristletails in the family Machilidae. Currently, there is one described species, Parapetrobius azoricus, which has only been found on Pico Island and the Formigas Islets in the archipelago of the Azores

References

Further reading

 
 
 
 
 

Archaeognatha
Endemic arthropods of the Azores
Articles created by Qbugbot